The 2019 Women's FIH Pro League was the first season of the Pro League, the premier women's field hockey national team league series. The tournament started in January 2019 finished in June 2019 in Amstelveen, Netherlands.

The Netherlands defeated Australia 4–3 in a shoot-out after the final ended in a 2–2 draw to win the first FIH Pro League title.

The competition also served as a qualifier for the 2020 Summer Olympics with the four best teams qualifying for the FIH Olympic Qualifiers taking place in October and November 2019.

Qualification
Nine teams competed in a round-robin tournament with home and away matches, played from January to June, with the top four teams advancing to the final at a pre-determined location. In July 2017, Hockey India decided to withdraw the women's national team from the competition as they estimated the chances of qualifying for the Summer Olympics to be higher when participating in the Hockey Series. Hockey India also cited lack of clarity in the ranking system. The International Hockey Federation subsequently invited Belgium instead.

 (4)
 (3)
 (13)
 (10)
 (5)
 (2)
 (1)
 (6)
 (12)

Squads

Results

Standings

Fixtures
All times are local.

Grand Final

Semifinals

Third place game

Final

Awards

Statistics

Final standings

Goalscorers

See also
2019 Men's FIH Pro League
2018–19 Women's Hockey Series

References

External links

Women's FIH Pro League
Women
FIH Pro League